The 2019 Úrvalsdeild kvenna was the 48th season of the women's football top level league in Iceland. Breiðablik is the defending champion.

Teams
The 2019 Úrvalsdeild kvenna is contested by ten teams, eight of which played in the division the previous year and two teams promoted from 1. deild kvenna. The bottom two teams from the previous season, Grindavík and FH, were relegated to the 1. deild kvenna and were replaced by Keflavík and Fylkir, champions and runners-up of the 2018 1. deild kvenna respectively.

Club information

Source: Scoresway

League table

Top goalscorers

References

External links
 Official website

Isl
Icell
1
2019